Princess Oraprabandh Rambai (7 July 1885 – 25 May 1933), was the Princess of Siam (later Thailand). She was a member of Siamese Royal Family. She is a daughter of Chulalongkorn.

Her mother was On Bunnag, daughter of Lord (Chao Phraya) Surabandh Bisudhi (niece of Si Suriyawongse). She is the elder sister of Princess Adisaya Suriyabha. She and her mother, and younger sister lived together firstly in the Grand Palace, then moved to the area of Dusit Palace, and lived there all of her life.

After an illness she died on 25 May 1933, at the age of 47.

Royal Decorations
  Dame Cross of the Most Illustrious Order of Chula Chom Klao (First class): received 25 November 1906

Ancestry

1885 births
1933 deaths
19th-century Thai women
19th-century Chakri dynasty
20th-century Thai women
20th-century Chakri dynasty
Thai female Phra Ong Chao
Dames Grand Cross of the Order of Chula Chom Klao
Children of Chulalongkorn
Daughters of kings